Viscount  was a statesman in Meiji period Japan.  During the Meiji Restoration he used the alias

Life and career 
Yuri was a samurai born in Fukui, Echizen Province (present-day Fukui Prefecture).  He studied under the Confucian scholar Yokoi Shōnan. He worked towards the financial reform and modernizing of the Fukui domain and received preferential treatment from daimyō Matsudaira Yoshinaga due to his great ability.

Yuri joined the new Meiji government as a san'yo (senior councillor), and took charge of the financial and monetary policy of the new government. Together with Fukuoka Takachika, he was the principal author of the Charter Oath. Yuri was involved in the issuance of Japan's first national paper banknotes in 1868.

In 1871, he became the fourth governor of Tokyo. Yuri left the role the following year, but was selected as one of the members of the Iwakura Mission on its around-the-world voyage to the United States and Europe. After his return to Japan, he joined Itagaki Taisuke in petitioning for a representative national assembly.

In 1875, he was appointed to the Genrōin. In 1887 he was elevated to the rank of shishaku (viscount) in the kazoku peerage system. He was nominated to serve in the House of Peers of the Diet of Japan in 1890.

In 1891, Yuri quit government service, moved to Kyoto, and founded the Yurin Seimeihoken K.K., one of Japan's first life insurance companies. The company later merged with Meiji Seimei, the predecessor to Meiji Yasuda Life Insurance Company.

Notes

References 
 
; ;  OCLC 185681292

;  OCLC 579232
 
 OCLC 12311985
 
 OCLC 58053128

External links 

 National Diet Library photo & bio

1829 births
1912 deaths
People from Fukui Prefecture
Japanese businesspeople
Members of the House of Peers (Japan)
Kazoku
People of Meiji-period Japan
Meiji Yasuda Life